Deirdre Hanford (Deirdre Ryan Hanford )  is an American executive in electronic design automation industry.   she is Chief Security Officer for Synopsys.

Education and work
Deidre earned a B.S. in electric engineering from Brown University (1983) and a M.S. in electric engineering from UC Berkeley.

She joined Synopsys in 1987, becoming its 8th employee. Since then she advanced via many roles.

In 2008 she was  Chairman of the American Electronics Association.

Awards and recognition
2001: Marie Pistilli Award -  “Deirdre was chosen for this award because of her pioneering leadership and dedicated commitment to serving the design community” (Mar Hershenson,  chair of the Workshop for Women in Design Automation)  
2001:  YWCA Tribute to Women and Industry (TWIN) Award 
1983: Domenoco A. Iolanta Award from Brown University for her senior year team research project

Personal
Deirdre has three sons. She praises Synopsys for the company's supportive attitude towards women. Her first three promotions coincided with her pregnancies. Deidre is quoted as saying, "Synopsys didn't mommy-track me when I started a family".

References

Year of birth missing (living people)
Living people
Electronic design automation people
Brown University alumni
University of California, Berkeley alumni
Electronic engineering award winners